The 2013 Philippine Basketball Association (PBA) Rookie Draft was an event, which allows teams to draft players from the amateur ranks. The event was held at Midtown Atrium, Robinson Place Manila on November 3, 2013.

Draft lottery
The lottery determined the team that will obtain the first pick on the draft. The remaining first-round picks and the second-round picks were assigned to teams in reverse order of their cumulative final rankings in the previous season with heavier weight from the results of the Philippine Cup.

Lottery teams—green: 67% chance; blue: 33% chance

The lottery was held on October 11, 2013, during the halftime of the Game 1 of the 2013 PBA Governors' Cup Finals at the Mall of Asia Arena in Pasay. The Air21 Express won the rights to the first overall selection against the GlobalPort Batang Pier. Due to a previous transaction, the draft rights of Air21 belonged to the Barangay Ginebra San Miguel. GlobalPort's drafting rights were also previously traded to San Mig Coffee Mixers.

Draft

1st round

2nd round
Note: Air 21 and Alaska switched places in the 5th and 6th picks prior to an earlier trade agreement.

3rd round

4th round

Note: GlobalPort (1st pick), Alaska (8th), Rain or Shine (9th) and San Mig Coffee (10th) passed on this round

5th round

Note: Petron Blaze (5th pick) passed on this round

6th round

Note: Air21 (2nd pick), Barako Bull (3rd), and Talk 'N Text (7th) passed on this round

7th round

Note: Barangay Ginebra (4th pick) passed on this round; Meralco passed its supposed 6th pick in the 8th round to end the draft.

Trades involving draft picks

Pre-draft trades
 On August 12, 2012, in a three-team trade, Barangay Ginebra acquired a 2013 first round pick and Elmer Espiritu from Air21, the Express acquired Nonoy Baclao and Rob Reyes from Petron and KG Canaleta and John Wilson from Ginebra, and the Blaze Boosters acquired Magi Sison, Paolo Hubalde and a 2014 second round pick from the Express.
 On September 21, 2012, San Mig Coffee Mixers acquired a 2013 first round pick and Wesley Gonzales from Barako Bull in exchange for Josh Urbiztondo. Previously, the Energy Cola (as Air21) acquired the pick and a 2012 second round pick on January 31, 2011, from Powerade in exchange for J.R. Quiñahan. Powerade's franchise was sold to GlobalPort before the 2012-13 season. 
 On January 20, 2011, in a three-team trade, Rain or Shine acquired a first round pick, a 2011 first round pick, Ronjay Buenafe and Ronnie Matias from Barako Bull (as Air21) and Beau Belga from Meralco, the Express acquired Reed Juntilla, and 2011 and 2013 second round picks from the Bolts, and the Bolts acquired Sol Mercado and Paolo Bugia from the Elasto Painters and Erick Rodriguez from the Express.
  On November 16, 2011, in a three-team trade, Barako Bull acquired Jimbo Aquino and a 2013 first round pick from Barangay Ginebra, Ginebra acquired Rico Maierhofer from San Mig Coffee (as B-Meg) and Allein Maliksi from the Energy, and the Llamados acquired Yancy de Ocampo and a 2012 second round pick from Ginebra via the Energy.
 
 
  On June 11, 2013, in a three-team trade, GlobalPort acquired a first round pick and Yousef Taha from Barangay Ginebra in exchange for Japeth Aguilar. Previously, Ginebra acquired the pick from Barako Bull on the same day in exchange for Elmer Espiritu. Previously, in a three-team trade, Barako Bull (as Burger King) acquired 2012 and 2013 first round pick from Talk 'N Text, and 2010 and 2012 first round picks on October 12, 2009, from Barako Energy Coffee via the Tropang Texters; the Coffee Masters acquired Orlando Daroya from the Tropang Texters; and the Tropang Texters acquired Japeth Aguilar from the Whoppers. The Coffee Masters franchise was later sold, first to become the Shopinas.com Clickers/Air21 Express. It was sold again to become the NLEX Road Warriors. 
 On October 4, 2011, Alaska acquired a 2013 second round pick from Meralco in exchange for Mark Borboran.

Draft-day trades
  The Barangay Ginebra San Miguel re-acquired the draft rights to 4th pick James Forrester from Barako Bull in exchange for Rico Maierhofer and Willy Wilson.
  The GlobalPort Batang Pier acquired the draft rights to 5th pick Terrence Romeo from Barako Bull. Previously, Petron acquired the pick from the Energy in exchange for Magi Sison and Mark Isip, then the Blaze Boosters acquired Yousef Taha from GlobalPort in exchange for the pick.
  The GlobalPort Batang Pier acquired the draft rights to 6th pick RR Garcia from Barako Bull in exchange for Dennis Miranda.
  The Talk 'N Text Tropang Texters acquired the draft rights to 15th pick John Paul Erram from Alaska in exchange for a 2015 second round pick.
  The GlobalPort Batang Pier acquired the draft rights to 34th pick LA Revilla, and 2016 and 2017 second round picks from Barangay Ginebra in exchange for a 2014 first round pick.

Undrafted players

References

External links
 PBA.ph

Philippine Basketball Association draft
Draft
PBA draft